The National Rugby League is the top level rugby league competition in Australia and New Zealand. It was formed in 1998 after the merger of the Australian Super League and the Australian Rugby League. Inaugurally containing 20 teams, rationalisation cut this number down to 14 by 2000, before the competition expanded back to 16 by 2007. A 17th club, the Dolphins, joined the league in 2023.

History

1998-2000: Melbourne, St George Illawarra, Northern Eagles, Wests Tigers
The Australian Super league and the ARL combined had 22 teams in 1997. When the NRL was formed in 1998, it was decided that there would only be 20 teams. The Melbourne Storm were the sole expansion team that year, meaning that the NRL had to remove three teams: the WA Reds, the South Queensland Crushers and the Hunter Mariners. In 1999 the Adelaide Rams and the Gold Coast Chargers were removed from the competition, as were the South Sydney Rabbitohs in 2000.

The NRL achieved further reduction in the number teams through mergers of established clubs from Sydney and regional New South Wales. There were three mergers between 1999 and 2000 – The St. George Dragons and Illawarra Steelers formed the St. George Illawarra Dragons, the Western Suburbs Magpies and Balmain Tigers formed Wests Tigers, and the Manly Warringah Sea Eagles and North Sydney Bears formed the Northern Eagles. The Northern Eagles dissolved in 2002 and the Sea Eagles returned to the competition the following year.

Return of the South Sydney Rabbitohs (2002)
The South Sydney Rabbitohs were re-admitted to the competition for the 2002 NRL season after a legal battle with the NRL over their expulsion in the 2000 season, with the help of New Zealand-born Australian actor and Rabbitohs supporter Russell Crowe.

Gold Coast Titans (2007)
The Gold Coast Titans were admitted to the NRL for the 2007 season, beating out bids from the Central Coast Bears and Wellington Orcas.

Dolphins (2023)
On 13 October 2021, Queensland Cup side the Redcliffe Dolphins were granted a license to field an NRL side from the 2023 season to become the NRL's 17th franchise. They beat out bids from other Queensland rivals, the Brisbane Jets and Brisbane Firehawks.

Future expansion
On 28 April 2021, it was reported that the NRL was considering an eventual 18-team competition divided into two conferences. The format that’s been suggested by NRL officials would see the nine Sydney-based clubs compete in one conference and the remaining nine teams in the other, with each team playing each other once and then a second time against the other teams in their respective conference. The intended effect is to strengthen the rivalries between the Sydney-based clubs by guaranteeing they all play each other twice, but it would come with the downside of forcing non-Sydney teams to travel a lot more than Sydney teams.

Current Bids/Potential Markets

The Bears

After the Northern Eagles went defunct, the North Sydney Bears have continued to field teams in several grades of the NSW rugby league competitions, and were behind the failed Central Coast Bears bid in the mid-2000's. But the Bears have expressed their intent on eventually returning the brand to the NRL competition. In 2018 they’d explored the possibility of establishing a ‘Western Bears’ franchise based in Perth.

On October 27, 2021, the Bears revealed their intention to return to the NRL, coinciding with a new logo. The proposed franchise, to be known simply as 'The Bears', would split home matches between various regional centres as well as major cities that are otherwise currently without NRL representation, allocating between four and six games at a potentially upgraded North Sydney Oval.

Cairns-PNG
A joint bid representing the Far North Queensland city of Cairns and Papua New Guinea was suggested in 2018, though further details such as how a Cairns-PNG team would split home games were never revealed.

Papua New Guinea

In October 2008, a Papua New Guinea Rugby Football League NRL bid team was launched with government funding and support. An official website was launched in September 2009 detailing the progress of the PNG bid and its aim to provide social and economic benefits for the country as a whole. The Papua New Guinea Hunters, founded in 2014, have since joined the Queensland Cup and won the 2017 title.

In February 2021, PNG Prime Minister James Marape declared his hopes of an NRL side in the country by 2025.

Perth

Since the Western Reds were not included in the NRL’s inaugural season, Perth is the largest Australian city without a team in the competition. Advocates for a Perth-based team have argued it is necessary for the NRL to consider itself a ‘truly national’ competition. The Reds name was revived in 2006 as the WA Reds, competing in the under-18s S.G. Ball Cup with the intention of eventually fielding an NRL side. The team rebranded as the West Coast Pirates in 2012 and continued competing in the S.G. Ball Cup until the COVID-19 pandemic prevented them from being able to compete from 2020 onwards. In April 2021, ARLC commissioner Peter Beattie claimed that Western Australia was "years away" from having an NRL team.

WA businessman Tony Sage, who owns A-League club Perth Glory, registered the name West Coast Quokkas in April 2021, as a potential name for a new NRL side in the state.

Former Reds chairman Laurie Puddy has also been invested in reintroducing a Perth-based NRL side. In May 2021, he hit out at the NRL’s prioritisation of a second New Zealand team over a Perth team, calling it "immoral". In October, he revealed plans to revive the Reds name. He suggested such a team could be ready to begin competing in 2024, the year after the Dolphins are due to begin play, and could also attract crowds of 20,000 at Perth's HBF Park.

Queensland
A fifth Queensland-based side has also been suggested, opening the door for the Brisbane Jets and Brisbane Firehawks consortiums after both lost out to the Dolphins for the 17th NRL license.

Southern Orcas
In March 2021, NRL CEO Andrew Abdo suggested an 18th team could be based in New Zealand to create a rivalry with the New Zealand Warriors. So far the sole prospective bidder for a second New Zealand-based team is a resurrected Wellington Orcas bid led by former New Zealand Rugby League chair Andrew Chalmers. The proposed team, potentially under the name ‘Southern Orcas’, would play most home games at Sky Stadium and also take games to Christchurch and Dunedin.

Fiji
There is an ongoing bid in Fiji for an NRL team. In 2019, whilst visiting Suva, Australian Prime Minister Scott Morrison announced he would support and fund the bid.

Adelaide 

There has always been an ongoing debate about whether the Adelaide Rams should make a return to the NRL, with some even suggesting that the Rams join the NSW Cup before being progressed to the NRL. Supporters for an Adelaide Rams revival have organised online petitions with the aim of generating support for an NRL bid. The South Australian Ministry of Sport, Recreation and Racing have stated that they are actively researching on how to develop an Adelaide NRL franchise.

The North Sydney Bears have not ruled out the possibility of relocating to Adelaide. However, most communications as of 2022 imply that Perth is the club's area of focus.

Past bids
Other consortiums and clubs have expressed interest in launching an NRL team in past years. These bids have gone quiet more recently and are considered defunct.

Brothers Leprechauns
In April 2013, a bid was made to bring Brothers Leprechauns into the NRL, uniting and representing a large base revolving around over 40 Brothers clubs across three states. Bid founder Justin Barlow proposed to base a Brothers NRL team at Corbett Park in Brisbane’s northern suburbs and primarily play out of Suncorp Stadium. The team was also proposed to take a handful of home games each year to regional centres, and would be the pathway for junior rugby league players that come up through a club in the Brothers Confraternity.

The Brothers Confraternity made no expression of interest when the NRL declared its interest in introducing another Brisbane-based side in 2020.

Central Coast Bears

The Central Coast Bears were a proposed team based on the Central Coast of New South Wales, Australia. They were trying to be included in an expanded National Rugby League competition since 2006. The proposed team would have played 11 games in Gosford and one game against Manly at North Sydney Oval, in the annual Heritage Round.

Central Queensland

In April 2009, a consortium from the Central Queensland region declared their intent to launch a bid for an NRL team to be based in Rockhampton. The bid aimed to be a new club by 2013.

South Pacific Cyclones
Following the failed Wellington Orcas bid, the Wellington Rugby League began working on a proposal and business plan for a second New Zealand based team in 2008. They proposed a club that would be based in Wellington and divide their games between the New Zealand capital and other locations in New Zealand and the Pacific Islands.

See also

 Rugby Football League expansion

References

National Rugby League
Expansion of the National Rugby League
Proposed sports teams